William Krehm (November 23, 1913 – April 19, 2019) was a Canadian author, journalist, political activist and real estate developer. He was a prominent Trotskyist activist in the 1930s and went to Spain where he participated in the Spanish Civil War. In the 1980s he co-founded the Committee on Monetary and Economic Reform (COMER) in the 1980s and continued as the group's principal leader until his death. He died in April 2019 at the age of 105.

Early life
Krehm was born in Toronto to Hyman and Sarah Krehm, Jews who had left the Russian Empire separately between 1905 and 1910, before meeting and marrying in Toronto's St. John's Ward, known as The Ward, a working class district that was home to successive waves of immigrants.  Hyman Krehm and his brother, Harry, had been furriers in Russia and continued that trade in Canada. William Krehm was a talented violinist and his sister, Ida (1912-1998), a promising pianist prompting their parents to send both of them to  Chicago to study music in the 1920s. While Ida remained in Chicago, ultimately marrying musician and industrialist Joseph Pick, and becoming a pianist and conductor of international renown, William Krehm moved to New York City where he worked selling hats. After the 1929 Stock Market Crash, he became interested in Marxism.

Returning to Toronto, he attended Parkdale Collegiate Institute and was a tutor to fellow student Gladys Cowan whom he would later marry. He graduated from high school in 1930 and studied mathematics at the University of Toronto for two years before dropping out for lack of funds. Other sources, however, describe him as a University of Toronto graduate.

Trotskyism
By 1932, Krehm had become a Trotskyist, recruited to the movement by Albert Glotzer, and joined the nascent Canadian Trotskyist movement in Toronto, which was a branch of the US-based Communist League of America. Krehm led a faction in opposition to Canadian Trotskyist leader Maurice Spector and dropped in and out of the organization, eventually moving to Montreal and becoming leader of the party branch there. In 1934, Krehm and his followers, along with B. J. Field and his followers in the United States, left the CLA to form the Organizing Committee for a Revolutionary Workers Party (later known as the League for a Revolutionary Workers Party, and colloquially as the "Fieldites"), and affiliated with the international organization known as the International Bureau of Revolutionary Socialist Parties or London Bureau. Krehm became leader of the Canadian group and editor of its newspaper Workers' Voice.

Spanish Civil War
In July 1936, Krehm sailed to Europe via the RMS Empress of Britain. Krehm went to Europe as the League for a Revolutionary Workers Party's delegate to a conference of the International Revolutionary Marxist Centre being held in Brussels in October. He visited Barcelona for five days in September before returning to Belgium, and went back to Spain the following month, after the conference, becoming one of 1,600 Canadians who volunteered to fight in the Spanish Civil War. Krehm left in late 1936 to attend a conference of left-wing groups in Paris and then went to London where he met Charles Donnelly, spending Christmas with him. Donnelly urged Krehm to join the International Brigades with him. However, he decided to return to Spain on his own and joined the Partido Obrero de Unificación Marxista (POUM) as a propagandist, translator and journalist, and as such would occasionally visit the front lines, and was one of the last survivors of that conflict.

He met fellow POUM member Eric Arthur Blair, (better known by his pen name, George Orwell), and used to chat with him in the cafes of Barcelona. Krehm was in Barcelona during the May Days street battles when the Comintern-affiliated Unified Socialist Party of Catalonia attempted to eliminate the POUM. In June 1937, after the POUM was outlawed by the Spanish Republic at the instigation of the Communist Party, the house in which Krehm was staying was raided by Spanish secret police and he and his comrades were detained with Krehm under suspicion of being a spy He spent three months in jail and was released after a hunger strike, driven by police to the French border, and expelled from Spain in August 1937, arriving in Halifax at the end of November. Krehm returned to Toronto where he wrote a pamphlet, Spain: Revolution and Counter-Revolution, and toured Canada and the US giving speeches about his experiences in Spain.

Anti-fascist activism in Canada
Resuming his leadership of the Canadian section of the League for a Revolutionary Workers Party which was, for a time, larger and more active than the official Trotskyist group it had split from. In July 1938, he was charged with obstructing police who were trying to disperse an anti-fascist rally organized by the League for a Revolutionary Workers Party and held across from a fascist rally held by the National Union Party at Massey Hall. Krehm was arrested after he refused a police request to call off the rally. In response, a rally was organized in the United States which organizers estimated to have attracted 4,000 protesters. Krehm and his colleague were found guilty and fined $25 each.

Foreign correspondent in Latin America
Finding that the Trotskyist movement had dwindling support, and increasingly disillusioned by revolutionary politics following his experiences in Spain, Krehm moved to Mexico, arriving with only $270 in his pocket, in the hopes of working as a foreign correspondent. When World War II broke out he wanted to return to Canada to enlist in the military but couldn't when he found he was not allowed to cross the border into the United States.

While in Mexico City, he sought and was granted an interview with Leon Trotsky but the exiled Soviet revolutionary was assassinated on August 21, 1940, before the interview could take place. Krehm stood guard over his body at his funeral.

Krehm would remain in Latin America for eight years. During this period, Gladys left Canada to join him and they married and had a son, Adam, while the couple was living in Peru. After struggling for several years as a freelance journalist, Krehm was hired by Time Magazine in 1943 as the magazine's correspondent in Latin America. With the emergence of the Cold War, Krehm was fired by Time in 1947 after writing several articles and a book critical of American intervention in Latin America and the Caribbean.

Return to Canada
Unemployed, Krehm returned to Canada in 1948 with his wife and worked as a music critic for The Globe and Mail and CBC Radio, appearing on CJBC Views The Shows in the mid-1950s.

As the Cold War intensified in the 1950s, Krehm found that his radical past imperiled his employability. His home was frequently visited by the RCMP Security Service and his appearances on CBC came to an end.

Finding it difficult to sustain enough employment to support his family, which had grown with the birth of a second son, Jonathan, Krehm decided to start his own business as a home builder and property developer in the mid-1950s. In 1963, he and his brother-in-law, Ben Cowan, founded what is now O'Shanter Development Co. Benefiting from the post-war property development boom in the Toronto suburbs during the post-war housing boom, Krehm became wealthy and O'Shanter became one of Toronto's biggest landlords. In the 1970s and 80s, he campaigned against rent control after it was introduced by the provincial government.

Krehm retired from O'Shanter in the 1980s, turning the operation of the company over to his sons, who continue to own and operate it today.

COMER
Krehm retired in the 1980s and devoted his time to studying and writing on economics, co-founding the Committee on Monetary and Economic Reform later in the 1980s.

In 2011, Krehm was the co-plaintiff in a suit by COMER against the Bank of Canada in an attempt to compel it to provide debt-free support for public projects undertaken by federal, provincial and city governments. The plaintiffs argued that by not doing so, the bank was violating the Bank of Canada Act. The lawsuit also alleged that the federal government had ceded its sovereign ability to conduct independent monetary policy to "secret" deliberations and  private foreign bankers. The case was dismissed by the Federal Court of Appeal in 2016. In May 2017, the Supreme Court of Canada denied the plaintiffs' request for leave to appeal.

Later life
Krehm continued playing violin into his 90s. He died, aged 105, in Toronto in 2019.

Works by William Krehm
SPAIN: Revolution and Counter-Revolution (1937?)
Democracia y tiranias en el Caribe (1947)
Growing Pains for Latin America (1948)
Price in a mixed economy: Our record of disaster (1975)
Babel's tower: The dynamics of economic breakdown (1977)
How to Make Money in a Mismanaged Economy and Other Essays (1980)
Democracies and tyrannies of the Caribbean (1984, originally published in Spanish in 1947)  
A power unto itself : the Bank of Canada : the threat to our nation's economy (1993)

References

1913 births
2019 deaths
Canadian Trotskyists
Canadian centenarians
Men centenarians
Monetary reformers
Journalists from Toronto
Writers from Toronto
Time (magazine) people
Canadian reporters and correspondents
Real estate and property developers
Classical music critics
Businesspeople from Toronto
Canadian people of the Spanish Civil War
Canadian anti-fascists
Jewish anti-fascists
Jewish socialists
Members of the Communist League of America
Former Marxists
The Globe and Mail people
Canadian Broadcasting Corporation people
Jewish Canadian journalists